Johann Georg, Chevalier de Saxe (21 August 1704 – 25 February 1774), also called Johann Georg of Saxony, was a Saxon Field Marshal and Governor of Dresden.

He was an illegitimate son of August the Strong, King of Poland and Elector of Saxony, and Ursula Katharina of Altenbockum, divorced Princess Lubomirska, since August 1704 Imperial Princess (Reichsfürstin) of Teschen.

Life
When he was legitimized, his father gave him the title of Chevalier de Saxe. Initially, Johann Georg chose a spiritual path and became a Knight of Malta, but later, like all of August's illegitimate sons, he joined the army, starting at the top (as a general). On July 27, 1763, he was appointed field-marshal Generalfeldmarschall.

On 27 November 1764 Johann Georg acquired, for 14,000 thalers, the so-called Zinzendorfschen Garden, located outside Dresden's city gates. In the middle of the property, the building and landscape architect Friedrich August Krubsacius built magnificent palaces in a reserved form of the Rococo style. These were (after the Moszinskapalais and the Brühlschen Palais in Dresden-Friedrichstadt) the third "Maison de Plaisance" of the aristocracy outside the Dresden city walls. The interiors were not excessively large, emphasis being on the contemporary inclination towards elegance, intimacy and comfort. The palace annexes provided for functional spaces.

The garden was also extended into some fields on the property, being reshaped significantly. According to the principles of the French Baroque garden, it was severe in design. The palaces determined the centerline of the whole arrangement, with the salon overlooking all the garden's essential parts.

On 30 January 1770 the Chevalier took leave of the army and moved to his garden property, without however renouncing his right to the large urban royal suite. Four years later, aged sixty-nine, after a prolonged illness, he died.

In his will, the Chevalier declared his half-sister, Fredericka Alexandrine, Countess of Cosel (by marriage Countess Moszinska) his sole heir. For the separation of still more existing debts the obligation was imposed on her to offer the garden with the palace first to the Elector and then the prince Karl for 15,000 talers to the purchase. Only for the case of the refusal she should keep the garden, but against Erlegung of a capital of 10.000 talers for the separation of the debts.

Immediately after the reading of the will, it was contested by the Commander of the Knights of Malta, the Oberhofmeister Baron of Forell. He informed the Elector that the Chevalier had been a member of the Order since 1728, and that consequently his estate belonged to the Knights of Malta. In 1776, the lawsuit brought by the Order was decided in its favour. As the deceased had badly underestimated his debts, amounting to c. 36,000 talers, the estate was liquidated, with creditors realizing 80% of the debts owed them and the Order receiving only 5,000 talers.

Johann Georg was buried in the Roman Catholic Churchyard (Innerer Katholischen Friedhof) in Dresden.

Field marshals of Saxony
German knights
House of Wettin
Illegitimate children of Augustus the Strong
1704 births
1774 deaths
Albertine branch
Recipients of the Order of the White Eagle (Poland)
Sons of kings